Maria Elisabeth Persson (born 21 January 1964) is a Swedish curler, world champion and Olympic medalist. She received a bronze medal at the 1998 Winter Olympics in Nagano. She is three times world champion with the Swedish team, from 1995, 1998 and 1999, with skip Elisabet Gustafson.

In 1993 she was inducted into the Swedish Curling Hall of Fame and in 2020 she and the rest of Team Gustafson were inducted into the World Curling Hall of Fame.

References

External links

1964 births
Living people
Swedish female curlers
World curling champions
Olympic curlers of Sweden
Curlers at the 1998 Winter Olympics
Curlers at the 2002 Winter Olympics
Olympic bronze medalists for Sweden
Olympic medalists in curling
Medalists at the 1998 Winter Olympics
Continental Cup of Curling participants
European curling champions